Sankaramanchi (Telugu: శంకరమంచి) is an Indian surname found among Telugu Brahmin community.

Notable people
Notable people with the surname include:
 Sankaramanchi Janaki, popularly known as Sowcar Janaki, is a South Indian actress
 Satyam Sankaramanchi (1937–1987), popular Telugu writer

References

Indian surnames